A Crampton locomotive is a type of steam locomotive designed by Thomas Russell Crampton and built by various firms from 1846.  The main British builders were Tulk and Ley and Robert Stephenson and Company.

Notable features were a low boiler and large driving wheels. The crux of the Crampton patent was that the single driving axle was placed behind the firebox, so that the driving wheels could be very large. This helped to give this design a low centre of gravity, so that it did not require a very broad-gauge track to travel safely at high speeds.

Design variations

Because the single driving axle was behind the firebox, Crampton locomotives usually had outside cylinders.  However, some inside cylinder versions were built using indirect drive, then known as a jackshaft.  The inside cylinders drove a crankshaft located in front of the firebox and the crankshaft was connected to the driving wheels by outside rods.  Some long-wheelbase s were also built using this crankshaft system.  The boiler feed-pump was often driven from the crankshaft as well because many Cramptons were built before the injector was invented.

Another peculiarity on some Crampton locomotives was the use of a boiler of oval cross-section, to lower the centre of gravity.  It would nowadays be regarded as bad engineering practice because the internal pressure would tend to push the boiler into a circular cross-section and increase the risk of metal fatigue.

Usage

Crampton locomotives were used by some British railways and speeds of up to 120 km/h (75 mph) were achieved on the LNWR. They were more popular in France, southern Germany and the US. In France the expression "prendre la Crampton" meant to catch an express, and in the argot of the Saint Cyr military academy, footplate staff were known as "officiers de Crampton" (and this as late as 1971). One of the French examples has been preserved in the Cité du Train (the French Railway Museum) at Mulhouse and is still in working order. This is number 80 of the Chemin de Fer de l'Est, the Paris-Strasbourg line, which is named "Le Continent".

Locomotive list

The approximate numbers of Crampton-type locomotives built in Europe were:
 Great Britain: 51
 France: 127
 Germany: 135

Manufactured in Great Britain
Built by: Tulk and Ley, all of  wheel arrangement:

Notes:

Built by: Robert Stephenson and Company

Robert Stephenson and Company built a number of Crampton type locomotives for the South Eastern Railway and the London, Chatham and Dover Railway.  These were all of  wheel arrangement with inside cylinders and indirect drive. The inside cylinders drove a crankshaft located in front of the firebox and the crankshaft was coupled to the driving wheels by outside rods.

Notes:

Notes:

Built by: E. B. Wilson and Company

Notes:

Built by: R and W Hawthorn

Notes:

Built by: various builders

Notes:

Manufactured in France

Notes:

Manufactured in Germany

Notes:

See also
 Long Boiler locomotive
 6-2-0 for Crampton locomotives in the USA

References

Sources

External links

 The Cité du Train museum

Steam locomotive types